James Frederick Philpot (born 2 October 1996) is an English footballer who plays as a striker for Glebe.

Club career

Millwall
Philpot was first called up to a Millwall matchday squad on 21 March 2015, remaining an unused substitute in their 2–2 Championship draw with Brentford at Griffin Park. His next call-up was for their final game of the season following relegation to League One, away to Wolverhampton Wanderers at the Molineux. He came on for his debut as an 80th-minute substitute for Lee Martin, and less than two minutes later scored. However, in the 89th minute, he was substituted for fellow debutant Alfie Pavey due to injury and Millwall lost 2–4. After an unfortunate lay-off through injury, Philpot returned to first team action for The Lions after coming on as a second-half substitute in the 3–0 win against Blackpool. This followed a number of impressive displays in Millwall's under-21s.

On 21 October 2016, Philpot signed a 28-day loan with National League club Bromley. He made three appearances for The Ravens, before returning to Millwall on 15 November 2016.

On 3 August 2017, Philpot joined Woking on loan until January 2018. On 5 August 2017, Philpot made his Woking debut during their 2–1 home victory over Gateshead, replacing Bobson Bawling in the 70th minute. Philpot scored his first goal for Woking in their 2–1 win against AFC Fylde in the National League on 23 September 2017. A week later, Philpot continued his impressive form, scoring Woking's equaliser in their 1–1 home draw against Hartlepool United. Philpot scored once again three days later in their 2–0 away victory against Chester, latching onto a poor back pass and rounding the goalkeeper. Philpot returned to Millwall in January 2018, following the conclusion of his loan spell.

On 12 February 2018, Philpot joined National League South side Welling United on a one-month loan deal. Just under a week later, he scored on his debut during Welling's 3–1 home victory over St Albans City. On 14 March 2018, Philpot's loan was extended until the end of the campaign. In total, Philpot netted six times in fourteen appearances before returning to Millwall at the end of the season.

He was released by Millwall at the end of the 2017–18 season.

Dartford
On 1 August 2018, Philpot joined National League South side Dartford. Philpot left Dartford on 18 January 2019.

Maidstone United
On the same day as his release from Dartford, Philpot joined National League side Maidstone United on trial.

Bromley
On 9 February 2019, Philpot joined Bromley. On 12 March 2019, Bromley announced that Philpot had left the club having made just three substitute appearances.

Barrow
On 22 March 2019, Philpot joined Barrow on non-contract terms.

Staines Town
On 26 July 2019, Philpot joined Staines Town for the 2019/20 season.

Glebe
On 16 September 2019, Philpot joined Glebe in the Southern Counties East Premier Division having left Staines Town. On 30 April 2022, The Foxes announced that Philpot had signed a new contract until the end of the 2022–23 season.

Career statistics

References

External links

1996 births
People from Pembury
Living people
Association football midfielders
English footballers
Millwall F.C. players
Bromley F.C. players
Woking F.C. players
Welling United F.C. players
Barrow A.F.C. players
Staines Town F.C. players
Glebe F.C. players
English Football League players
National League (English football) players